Roy Rushbrook (29 September 1911 – 31 March 1987) was an Australian cricketer. He played in two first-class matches for Queensland between 1936 and 1938.

See also
 List of Queensland first-class cricketers

References

External links
 

1911 births
1987 deaths
Australian cricketers
Queensland cricketers
Cricketers from Brisbane